Laurel High School (LHS) is a public high school in Laurel, Delaware, a community in Sussex County. It is a part of the Laurel School District.

In addition to Laurel the school district serves Bethel.

References

External links 
 
 School district website

High schools in Sussex County, Delaware
Public high schools in Delaware